James Edward Campbell (born 1 April 1988 in Cheltenham, England) is a Great British and Scottish track and field athlete.

In 2009 Campbell improved his lifetime best to 76.71 to set his 3rd National record of his career.

At the Commonwealth Games trials, just weeks after he became UK Champion in 2010, Campbell became only the 10th Briton and 3rd British Under 23 to ever throw over 80m recording a new Scottish National Record and a lifetime best of 80.38.

Campbell also won a gold medal in the 2004 Commonwealth Youth Games, and he was recognized as Scotland's Athlete of the Games.

References

Further reading

External links

1988 births
Living people
Sportspeople from Cheltenham
Scottish male javelin throwers
British male javelin throwers
Commonwealth Games competitors for Scotland
Athletes (track and field) at the 2010 Commonwealth Games
Athletes (track and field) at the 2014 Commonwealth Games
British Athletics Championships winners